Vinson Filyaw (December 15, 1969  May 3, 2021) was an American construction worker. He was convicted of kidnapping and raping Elizabeth Shoaf, a 14-year-old girl from Lugoff, South Carolina, in 2006, holding her captive in an underground bunker.

Kidnapping
The survivor, Elizabeth Shoaf, was kidnapped after she got off her school bus on September 6, 2006. Filyaw gained her trust by posing as a police officer. He walked her around in the woods until she became disoriented and then marched her to a hand-dug 8x8 underground bunker, located within a mile of her own home.

Once inside, he stripped her naked, restrained her with chains, and raped her several times a day over the duration of her 10-day captivity. Police initially interpreted her disappearance as a runaway, and did not launch an Amber alert. Shoaf's poise and calm while she was held captive was considered remarkable by people involved with missing children cases. "Not only was she very brave, she was also very smart and did several things that greatly improved her chances of survival," said Captain David Thomley of the Kershaw County Sheriff’s Department.

 While being led into the woods, she dropped her shoes in the hope that it would provide a clue for someone who was searching for her.
 Despite receiving ongoing death threats and having explosives hung around her neck, she "would talk with him about things that interested him, which in his eyes, made her a person, not just a captive. She began to gain his trust."
 After continuing to gain his trust, she was allowed out of the bunker, and would "pull out strands of her hair [and] lay them on branches hoping search dogs might pick up her scent."

After 10 days in captivity, the victim convinced Filyaw to let her borrow his cellular phone to play games, but she had an entirely different use in mind. Once he fell asleep, she texted her mother and friends, who contacted the police. Before the police could triangulate the phone number, Sheriff Steve McCaskill thought that the text was a hoax. The former girlfriend who made the call to Kershaw County's Department of Social Services passed on Filyaw's cell phone number to the police. The authorities then began to triangulate the bunker's position through local cell phone towers.

Officer Dave Thomley did not know that Elizabeth Shoaf was underground in a bunker until Filyaw's former girlfriend showed them the first bunker he built. Thomley initially thought that it was a trash pit. Filyaw learned that he was being pursued when he watched the news on a battery-powered television in the bunker. He asked Shoaf for advice and she suggested he ought to run away to avoid capture. He left and the next morning Shoaf left the bunker and called for help until she was found by a rescue team.

Filyaw equipped the entrance of the bunker with a booby-trap, according to police.

Arrest
Filyaw was five miles from his house, carrying a taser, pellet gun, and knife, when he was arrested. He was charged with kidnapping, possession of an incendiary device (a flare gun), and impersonating a police officer, with other charges pending.

Trial and imprisonment
Filyaw pleaded guilty to all counts just before the start of the trial. The victim, Shoaf, was too emotional to testify, but a prepared statement was read by her attorney and she later made a public statement. Filyaw was sentenced to 421 years in prison without possibility of parole on September 19, 2007, by Circuit Judge G. Thomas Cooper. It was the maximum penalty under South Carolina law. He was incarcerated at the Maximum Security Unit at Kirkland Correctional Institution.

Death
Filyaw died in prison at McCormick Correctional Institution on May 3, 2021, at the age of 51; no cause of death has been determined.

Legacy
Shoaf later made several media appearances, including a 2008 episode of the Today show, on which Meredith Vieira did a profile of Shoaf and her family, commenting on her calmness throughout such a horrific event. The story aired on Dateline NBC on March 7, 2008. Filyaw's interaction with Shoaf was also explored on the "Underground Terror" episode of Investigation Discovery's Surviving Evil series, hosted by fellow crime survivor Charisma Carpenter, on September 9, 2013.

The entire ordeal was dramatized in the Lifetime movie Girl in the Bunker, which premiered on May 28, 2018. The film starred Julia LaLonde as Elizabeth Shoaf, Henry Thomas as Vinson Filyaw, and Moira Kelly as Madeline Shoaf.

References

External links
 Teen Rescued After Sending Text Message. CBS News September 17, 2006
 Filyaw Receives 421-Year Prison Sentence September 19, 2007

1969 births
2021 deaths
21st-century American criminals
American builders
American people convicted of kidnapping
American people convicted of rape
American prisoners and detainees
Criminals from South Carolina
People from Kershaw County, South Carolina
Place of birth missing
Prisoners and detainees of South Carolina